Dehqanan (also Romanized as Dehqānān; also known as Dehghanan) is a village in Dehqanan Rural District, in the Central District of Kharameh County, Fars Province, Iran. At the 2006 census, its population was 723, in 181 families.

References 

Populated places in Kharameh County